Aldo Mirate (7 May 1943 – 26 August 2022) was an Italian politician. A member of the Italian Communist Party, he served in the Chamber of Deputies from 1972 to 1979.

Mirate died in Asti on 26 August 2022, at the age of 79.

References

1943 births
2022 deaths
20th-century Italian politicians
21st-century Italian people
Italian Communist Party politicians
Deputies of Legislature VI of Italy
Deputies of Legislature VII of Italy
People from Asti